The  2012 ASEAN University Games officially known as the 16th ASEAN University Games was a Southeast Asian university multi-sports event held in Vientiane, Laos. This was the first time Laos hosted the games. Laos is the eighth nation to host the ASEAN University Games after Thailand, Indonesia, Malaysia, Singapore, Brunei, Philippines and Vietnam.

The games was held from 12 to 20 December 2012, although several events had commenced from 11 December 2012. Around 1700 athletes participated at the event which featured 240 events in 17 sports. It was opened and closed by Thongsing Thammavong, the Prime Minister of Laos at the New Laos National Stadium.

The final medal tally was led by Malaysia, followed by Vietnam and Thailand with host Laos in fifth place.

Development and preparation
The Organising Committee of the 16th ASEAN University Games was formed to oversee the staging of the games.

Venues
The 16th ASEAN University Games had 16 venues for the games.

Marketing

Logo

The 2012 ASEAN University Games logo is a "Nark" or "Naga" a worshipped animal throughout the ASEAN nations. According to Laotian myths, "Nark" or "Naga" appeared 450 years ago in the Lao saga before the establishment of Vientiane in which it took its name "Vientiane Chanthabury Sisattanabhut". It is said to be an animal full of omnipotent power and it's believed to parry spirits and evilness. The "Naga" logo bears the Plumeria alba, commonly known as Frangipani and locally known as Dok Champa, the symbolic and national flower of Laos, symbolises Laos as the host nation of the games. Overall, the logo represents the ASEAN University Games aim of creating good will of spiritual solidarity, friendship and peace within the ASEAN community.

Mascot
The official mascot of the 2012 ASEAN University Games is a pair of bees named Mr. Santiphap and Miss Mittaphap. The adoption of the Bee as the games' mascot is to relate the bees who work together in solidarity, strength and efficiency to the savants and architectures of the ASEAN nations. The name of the male mascot, Mr. Santiphab (Mr. Peace) represents the Peace between the ASEAN nations whereas the name of the female mascot, Miss Mittaphab (Miss Friendship) represents the Friendship between the ASEAN nations.

Motto
The official motto of the games is "We Are ASEAN Family". It was chosen to highlight the unity of the ASEAN countries through sport as well as the purpose of ASEAN University Games in creating solidarity, friendship and peace within the ASEAN Community.

The games

Opening ceremony 

The opening ceremony was held on 12 December 2012 at 17:30 (LST) at the New Laos National Stadium. The opening ceremony begins with the parade of athletes from participating nations into the stadium. The Laos contingent was led by Sonexay Mangkhuela, the gold medalist of Taekwondo event at the 2011 Southeast Asian Games in Indonesia. This was followed by the speech of the minister of Sports and Education of Laos, Phankham Viphavanh, the declaration of the games' opening by Thongsing Thammovong, then Prime minister of Laos and the athlete and referee oath and the lighting of the games cauldron. The ceremony concludes with the song and dance performance by 1600 Laotian primary school students.

Closing ceremony 

The closing ceremony was held on 20 December 2012 at 17:30 (LST) at the New Laos National Stadium in which Deputy Prime Minister of Laos, Mr Asang Laoly declared the Games closed.

Participating nations

Sports 

The 2012 ASEAN University Games programme featured 334 events in 17 sports and disciplines. The number of events in each discipline is noted in parentheses.

Calendar

Medal table 

Source:

References

External links
 2012 ASEAN University Games official website

ASEAN University Games
ASEAN University Games
ASEAN University Games
ASEAN University Games
Vientiane
Multi-sport events in Laos
21st century in Vientiane